The 2015–16 Hawaii Rainbow Wahine women's basketball team represented the University of Hawaii at Manoa during the 2015–16 NCAA Division I women's basketball season. The Wahine, led by fourth-year head coach Laura Beeman, played their home games at the Stan Sheriff Center as members of the Big West Conference. They finished the season 22–11, including 12–4 in Big West play to finish tied for second place with Long Beach State. Hawaii won the Big West tournament. With that conference tournament title, Hawaii earned an automatic bid to the NCAA tournament and lost in the first round to UCLA.

Previous season
The Wahine finished the 2014–15 season 23–9 (14–2 Big West), good for first place in the conference. After losing the championship round of the Big West tournament, Hawaii earned an automatic bid to the WNIT by virtue of winning its regular season conference title and lost in the first round.

Departures
Shawna-Lei Kuehu, Morgan Mason, and Shawlina Segovia, all seniors from the 2014–15 team, departed from the team due to graduation. In addition, freshmen Breana Jones and Jasmine Redmon left the team.

Recruits
On December 3, 2014, guard Olivia Crawford from Lakes High School in Lakewood, Washington signed her national letter of intent to play for Hawaii.

On May 28, 2015, Hawaii announced the signings of combo guard Andrea Easley out of Horizon High School in Scottsdale, Arizona, as well as twin sisters and forwards Lahni and Leah Salanoa, both from Rio Mesa High School in Oxnard, California.

Roster

Schedule
Sources:

|-
!colspan=9 style="background:#024731; color:#FFFFFF;"| Exhibition

|-
!colspan=9 style="background:#024731; color:#FFFFFF;"| Non-conference regular season

|-
!colspan=9 style="background:#024731; color:#FFFFFF;"| Exhibition
|-

|-
!colspan=9 style="background:#024731; color:#FFFFFF;"| Non-conference regular season

|-
!colspan=9 style="background:#024731; color:#FFFFFF;"| Big West regular season

|-
!colspan=9 style="background:#024731; color:#FFFFFF;"| Big West tournament
 
 
|-
!colspan=9 style="background:#024731; color:#FFFFFF;"| NCAA Tournament

See also
2015–16 Hawaii Rainbow Warriors basketball team

References

Hawaii Rainbow Wahine basketball seasons
Hawaii
2015 in sports in Hawaii
2016 in sports in Hawaii